Overall is a surname. Notable people with the surname include:

Christine Overall (born 1949), Canadian philosopher
John Overall (architect) (1913–2001), Australian architect
John Overall (bishop) (1559–1619), English bishop
Orval Overall (1881–1947), American baseball player
Park Overall (born 1957), American actress and activist
 Scott Overall (born 1983), British athlete

See also
Overall, garment
 Overall (disambiguation)

fr:Overall